Myanmar–Saudi Arabia relations refer to the bilateral relations between Saudi Arabia and Myanmar. Myanmar has an embassy in Riyadh whilst Saudi Arabia has an embassy in Yangon.

Relations
Saudi Arabia and Myanmar established relations in 2004.

Relations between Saudi Arabia and Myanmar only began to gain some notice after Myanmar began crackdowns on Rohingya people in 2012. Saudi Arabia has largely, by far, refrained from condemning Myanmar, due to lucrative business in the ASEAN which Saudi Arabia sought to expand its interests and economic relations with China. However, Saudi Arabia has criticized Myanmar over maltreatment of Rohingya population in, and extended their aids, though the needed business with China throughout Myanmar is required.

Saudi Arabia had agreed to accept 250,000 Rohingyas and other Burmese Muslims since 2009. With the death of King Abdullah in 2015, new King Salman had taken a tougher approach, detaining 3,000 Rohingyas before sending them back to Myanmar and Bangladesh in 2019. In 2020, Saudi Arabia's treatment toward Rohingya refugees have been conflicted: the country provided residency relief for 190,000 Burmese Muslims, while on the same time had also been reported of deporting another group of Rohingya refugees.

Saudi Arabia's Wahhabism is also being put to question for its role of fueling terrorism and insurgency in Myanmar, notably among the Rohingya population.

In cultural relations, Burmese Muslims have managed to integrate into the country and mostly speak Arabic and has recently moved on to address the residency issues to integrate further Burmese population.

See also
 Foreign relations of Saudi Arabia
 Foreign relations of Myanmar

References

External links
Embassy of the Republic of the Union of Myanmar, Riyadh

Myanmar
Saudi Arabia
Myanmar–Saudi Arabia relations